Azaad Desh Ke Gulam is an Indian Hindi-language film released on 6 April, starring Rishi Kapoor, Rekha and Jackie Shroff in lead roles. The film was a remake of Tamil film Sudhanthira Naattin Adimaigal. The film was a hit.

Plot 
Bharti Bhandari lives a wealthy life-style with her mom, Sharda, and dad, Ashok. She studies in law college, where she is in love with fellow-collegian, Vijay Srivastav. Another collegian, Vicky, who is also smitten with Bharti, tells her that Ashok has made millions not by a legitimate business but by smuggling, kidnapping, selling children and young women. Bharti is shocked, she confronts her father, but he denies everything. Satisfied that her dad would not lie to her, she goes for a trip to Goa along with Vijay and that's where she actually sees her dad, who is supposed to be in London, U.K., smuggling some children abroad a yacht. Bharti and Vijay find out that Ashok has vital documents that will lead to India being taken over by a foreign power, and they decide to put a stop to this. Before they could do anything, Vijay is killed. When Bharti confronts her parents, resulting in arguments, which lead to a physical struggle, resulting in the death of Sharda, and Bharti shooting Ashok to death. Bharti takes the documents and runs away to distant Ooty in a bid to escape the murder charge and bring the documents to the appropriate authorities. But Ashok's associates find out and she becomes their target, she hires a bodyguard named Jamliya, who proves to be unreliable. Bharti will now find that her worst nightmare comes true when a couple claiming to be her mom and dad surface out of nowhere, backed up by none other than her very own paternal uncle, Kishore Bhandari. The motive to prove her insane. But the question remains what will Kishore and her new parents gain by proving her insanity or is this nothing but her mind playing tricks on her. Later after bharti confesses her crime of killing her father Jamliya turns to be inspector who was behind bharti. Now as bharti was in jail inspector (jamliya) asks for the papers. She refuses and ask inspector to treat that minister without his uniform. Bharti was kidnapped by the minister. Later vijay saves Bharti and later they fought a case against the minister. The minister was sentenced but while leaving the court his men attacks them. In that fight vijay throws a rope on the minister to stop him which lead him to hanged till death.

Cast 
 Rishi Kapoor as Vijay Shrivastav / Chanakya
 Rekha as Bharati Bhandari
 Jackie Shroff as Inspector Jai Kishan / Jamliya
 Prem Chopra as Minister Narayan Das
 Pran as Ashok Bhandari
 Ashalata Wabgaonkar as Sharda Bhandari
 Ramesh Deo as Kishore Bhandari
Rakesh Bedi as Constable Kulkarni / Daulatram
 Mangal Dhillon as Mangal
 Mahavir Shah as Vicky
 Tiku Talsania as MLA Nagendra Rao 
 Sudhir Dalvi as Father Francis
 Vikas Anand as Jailor
Rajan Haksar as Police Inspector Tiwari

Songs
All lyrics are written by Sameer Anjaan. Soundtrack available on T-Series.

References

External links

1990 films
1990s Hindi-language films
Films scored by Laxmikant–Pyarelal
Hindi remakes of Tamil films
Films directed by S. A. Chandrasekhar